Melica uniflora, commonly known as wood melick, is a species of grass in the family Poaceae that is native to much of Europe, and to parts of South West Asia and North Africa.

Description
The species rhizomes are elongated. The leaf-blade bottom is pubescent, rough and scaberulous. The main branches have 1–6 fertile spikelets which are located on lower branches which are also scaberulous. Spikelets do ascend and have pedicelled fertile spikelets. The fruits are also ellipsoid and have an additional pericarp with linear hilum.

Taxonomy
Swedish naturalist Anders Jahan Retzius described the wood melick in 1779.

Distribution and habitat
The species can be found in such Asian countries as Iran and Turkey and in European ones such as Balearic Islands, Faroe Islands, Finland, Iceland, Moldova, Portugal, Spain, and Sweden. Also it was recorded in Algeria, Morocco and Tunisia.

Ecology and habitat
It can be found in hardwood forests near Fagus species. It also grows in dry and moist woodlands, which can either be acidic or neutral. Sandy or rocky soils are also common for such plants, but they need to be deep and loany as well. It grows on loamy soils in the north, while prefers decalcified soils in the south. The species is identical to Fagatalia which can be found in the Fagetum lowlands and also in the Carpinion. It rarely occurs in the Quercion clusters. Flowers bloom from May to July. Mostly, ants feed on the species caryopsis.

Melica uniflora in culture
In the 19th century it was engraved on the illustration by Jacob Sturm in the book Deutschlands Flora in Abbildungen nach der Natur mit Beschreibungen which was published in Nuremberg in 1862.

References

uniflora
Grasses of Africa
Grasses of Asia
Grasses of Europe
Flora of North Africa
Plants described in 1779
Taxa named by Anders Jahan Retzius